Solitudes is a brand of music created by Dan Gibson, a Canadian photographer, cinematographer and sound recordist.

During the late 1940s, he took photographs and made nature films, including Audubon Wildlife Theatre. He produced many films and television series. It was through this film-making that Dan learned how to record wildlife sound. He pioneered techniques of recording, and also helped design equipment to optimize results, including the “Dan Gibson Parabolic Microphone”. Some of his early recordings of the 1950s and 1960s were released on LP Records, and start of his Solitudes series, which was introduced in 1981. In 1994, Dan was awarded The Order of Canada for his environmental works. In 1997, Dan was awarded the Walt Grealis Special Achievement Award at the Juno Awards ceremony in Hamilton, Ontario.

In 2004, he released his first DVD, Natural Beauty, which was originally shot in High Definition. It is part of the new age genre.  Many CDs have been released over the years.  The music was originally designed to capture the sounds of various natural environments; sounds common to most albums include the wildlife, noise from swaying vegetation, and streams on water from a certain destination, usually indicated or implied through the theme of the specific album.  In the 1990s, instrumental music was integrated into the nature sounds to create a whole new line of albums with thematic elements based on the type of music played and the instruments used.

Major Productions
 Wings in the Wilderness - Feature Film (Narrated by Lorne Greene) 
 Audubon Wildlife Theatre - 78 episode TV series 
 Wildlife Cinema - multiple episode TV series 
 To the Wild Country - 10 episode TV series (Narrated by Lorne Greene) 
 Wild Canada - multiple episode TV series

Film Awards
 Whitethroat - Golden Gate Award - 1965 San Francisco Film Festival 
 Land of the Loon - Best TV Film of the Year and Certificate of Honour for outstanding contribution to the art of cinematography from the CSC, 1967 Canadian Film Awards 
 Adventure Trent Severn - Award of Merit, 1967 Canadian Film Awards 
 Winter Potpourri - Michigan Outdoor Writers Award of Merit 1969 
 Sounds of Nature - Etrog for Best Sound in a Non-theatrical Film, 1971 Canadian Film Awards 
 Fly Geese F-L-Y - Blue Ribbon Award for Best Children's Film, 1972 American Film Festival 
 Golden Autumn - Teddy Award, 1973 U.S. National Outdoor-Travel Film Festival 
 Dan Gibson's Nature Family - Best Wildlife Film of the Year, 1972 Canadian Film Awards 
 Return of the Giants - Best Wildlife Film of the Year, 1973 Canadian Film Awards 
 Land of the Big Ice - Best Wildlife Film of the Year, 1974 Canadian Film Awards 
 Wings In The Wilderness - Etrog for Best Sound in a Non-theatrical Film and Certificate of Honour for outstanding contribution to the art of cinematography from the CSC, 1975 Canadian Film Awards 
 Return of the Winged Giants - John Muir Award for Best Ecological Film, 1977 National Educational Film Festival, USA and Best Wildlife Film, 1977 Saskatchewan International Film Festival

Album Awards
 Solitudes albums have sold over 20,000,000 worldwide 
 15 Solitudes albums have been Certified Gold (50,000 units sold) in Canada 
 11 Solitudes albums have been Certified Platinum (100,000 units sold) or multi-Platinum status.

Discography
Until April 2012, about 223 studio albums were released by Solitudes. The years of release are according to Solitudes' official website. The albums released within the same year are listed randomly since no exact release date can be found.  This list is incomplete.

Studio albums
1980 - Walking through the forest 
1981 - Calming sea
1981 – Environmental Sound Experiences Volume One: By Canoe to Loon Lake, Dawn by a Gentle Stream
1981 – Environmental Sound Experiences Volume Two: The Sound of the Surf
1981 – Environmental Sound Experiences Volume Three: Among the Giant Trees of the Wild Pacific Coast, Spring Morning on the Prairies
1982 – Environmental Sound Experiences Volume Four: Niagara Falls, the Gorge and Glen, Among the Ponds and Streams of Niagara
1982 – Environmental Sound Experiences Volume Five: Dawn on the Desert, Among the Mountain Canyons and Valleys
1982 – Environmental Sound Experiences Volume Six: Storm on Wilderness Lake, Night on Wilderness Lake
1983 – Environmental Sound Experiences Volume Seven: Night in a Southern Swamp, Don't Feed the Alligators
1983 – Environmental Sound Experiences Volume Eight: Sailing to a Hidden Cove, Hiking Over Highlands
1983 – Environmental Sound Experiences Volume Nine: Seascapes (The Changing Moods of a Wild Coast)
1985 – Environmental Sound Experiences Volume Ten: Tradewind Islands (A Caribbean Adventure in Sound)
1987 – Environmental Sound Experiences Volume Eleven: National Parks and Sanctuaries Edition
1988 – Environmental Sound Experiences Volume Twelve: Listen to the Loons
1989 – Exploring Nature with Music: Harmony
1990 – Exploring Nature with Music: Breaking Through the Mist
1990 – Exploring Nature with Music: Pacific Suite
1991 – Exploring Nature with Music: Great Lakes Suite
1991 – Exploring Nature with Music: The Classics
1991 – Nature Trails: Teach Kids to Identify Wildlife by Sound
1992 – Exploring Nature with Music: Christmas Classics
1992 – Exploring Nature with Music: Algonquin Suite
1992 – Exploring Nature with Music: Atlantic Suite
1992 – Exploring Nature with Music: The Classics II
1993 – Exploring Nature with Music: Rocky Mountain Suite
1993 – Exploring Nature with Music: Strauss Waltzes (In Concert with the Sea)
1994 – Exploring Nature with Music: Appalachian Mountain Suite
1994 – Exploring Nature with Music: Christmas in the Country (Twelve Traditional Carols)
1994 – Exploring Nature with Music: Southwest Suite
1995 – Exploring Nature with Music: The Nature of Canada
1995 – Exploring Nature with Music: Angels of the Sea
1995 – Exploring Nature with Music: Journey with the Whales
1995 – Exploring Nature with Music: Legend of the Wolf
1995 – Exploring Nature with Music: Nature's Ballet
1995 – Exploring Nature with Music: Raindance: Impressions of a Native Land
1995 – Exploring Nature with Music: Rhythms of the Sea: Eight Piano Moods
1995 – Exploring Nature with Music: Pachelbel: Forever by the Sea
1995 – Nature Sound Collection: Thunderstorm in the Wilderness
1995 – Nature Sound Collection: Ocean Surf: Timeless and Sublime
1996 – Exploring Nature with Music: Songbirds at Sunrise
1996 – Exploring Nature with Music: Arctic Echoes
1996 – Exploring Nature with Music: Australian Odyssey
1996 – Exploring Nature with Music: Christmas Wonder
1996 – Exploring Nature with Music: Florida
1996 – Exploring Nature with Music: Forest Piano
1996 – Exploring Nature with Music: Island Paradise
1996 – Exploring Nature with Music: Spirit of Africa
1996 – Exploring Nature with Music: Voices of the Land
1997 – Exploring Nature with Music: Celtic Awakening
1997 – Exploring Nature with Music: Lullabies & Butterflies
1997 – Exploring Nature with Music: Stream of Dreams
1997 – Exploring Nature with Music: Thunder Spirit
1997 – Exploring Nature with Music: Whispering Woods (Guitar for Relaxation)
1997 – Exploring Nature with Music: Beethoven: Forever by the Sea
1997 – Exploring Nature with Music: Sunshowers: Solo Classical Piano
1998 – Exploring Nature with Music: Mozart: Forever by the Sea
1998 – Exploring Nature with Music: A Celtic Christmas Story
1998 – Exploring Nature with Music: Bach: Forever by the Sea
1998 – Exploring Nature with Music: Grand Canyon: A Natural Wonder
1998 – Exploring Nature with Music: Guardians of Atlantis
1998 – Exploring Nature with Music: Heart of Summer
1998 – Exploring Nature with Music: In the Midst of Angels
1998 – Exploring Nature with Music: Dance of the Hummingbird
1998 – Exploring Nature with Music: Piano Cascades
1998 – Music for Your Health: Natural Sleep Inducement
1998 – Music for Your Health: Natural Stress Relief
1999 – Emerald Forest: A Celtic Sanctuary
1999 – Exploring Nature with Music: Land of the Loon
1999 – Exploring Nature with Music: Caribbean Dream
1999 – Exploring Nature with Music: Discovering the Wild World
1999 – Exploring Nature with Music: Emerald Forest: A Celtic Sanctuary
1999 – Exploring Nature with Music: Jazz by Twilight
1999 – Exploring Nature with Music: Niagara Falls: A Natural Wonder
1999 – Exploring Nature with Music: Mountain Sunrise: Peaceful Pan Flutes
1999 – Exploring Nature with Music: Nature's Glory: Inspirational Hymns
1999 – Exploring Nature with Music: Secrets of the Jungle
1999 – Exploring Nature with Music: Shorelines: Classical Guitar
1999 – Exploring Nature with Music: Stargazing
1999 – Exploring Nature with Music: Yoga
1999 – Exploring Nature with Music: La Nature Du Quebec
1999 – Nature Sound Collection: Songbirds by the Stream
1999 – Music for Your Health: Natural Concentration
1999 – Music for Your Health: Natural Massage Therapy
2000 – Birdsong II
2000 – Exploring Nature with Music: Where Eagles Soar
2000 – Exploring Nature with Music: Classical Romance
2000 – Exploring Nature with Music: Moon River
2000 – Exploring Nature with Music: Pacific Grace: Spirit of the Killer Whale
2000 – Exploring Nature with Music: Piano Cove
2000 – Exploring Nature with Music: Colorado: Natural Splendor
2000 – Exploring Nature with Music: The English Country Garden
2000 – Exploring Nature with Music: Woodland Harp
2000 – Exploring Nature with Music: Woodland Flute
2000 – Nature Sound Collection: Waterscapes: The Therapeutic Power of Water
2000 – Music for Your Health: Natural Meditation
2000 – Music for Your Health: Natural Relaxation
2000 – Wildlife Identification by Sound
2000 – Exploring Nature with Music: Angel's Embrace
2001 – Exploring Nature with Music: Echoes in the Glen: Celtic Aires & Ballads
2001 – Exploring Nature with Music: Wild Wolf: Mysterious Beauty
2001 – Exploring Nature with Music: Alaska: A Wild Wonder
2001 – Exploring Nature with Music: Rolling Thunder
2001 – Exploring Nature with Music: Woodland Strings
2001 – Exploring Nature with Music: Somewhere Over the Rainbow
2001 – Exploring Nature with Music: Spring Awakening
2001 – Nature's Spa: Classical Bliss
2001 – Nature's Spa: Zen Escape
2001 – Nature's Spa: Stress Free
2001 – Nature's Spa: Soothing Massage
2001 – Fountain of Youth
2001 – Nature's Spa: Nurturing Rain
2002 – Exploring Nature with Music: Songbird Symphony
2002 – Exploring Nature with Music: Debussy: Forever by the Sea
2002 – Exploring Nature with Music: Forest Guitar
2002 – Exploring Nature with Music: Garden in Provence
2002 – Exploring Nature with Music: Lakeside Retreat
2002 – Exploring Nature with Music: Memories of Summertime
2002 – Exploring Nature with Music: Morning Has Broken
2002 – Exploring Nature with Music: Peaceful Classics
2002 – Exploring Nature with Music: Seaside Retreat
2002 – Exploring Nature with Music: Siesta Beach (Spanish Guitar)
2002 – Nature Sound Collection: Windsong: Wind Chimes in a Gentle Breeze
2003 – Exploring Nature with Music: Piano Songbirds
2003 – Exploring Nature with Music: Angelsong: Choral Classics by the Sea
2003 – Exploring Nature with Music: Classical Garden
2003 – Exploring Nature with Music: Country Retreat
2003 – Exploring Nature with Music: Deep Blue: Discovering the Coral Reef
2003 – Exploring Nature with Music: Island Retreat
2003 – Exploring Nature with Music: Lullabies: From Nature's Nursery
2003 – Exploring Nature with Music: Wind Beneath My Wings
2003 – Exploring Nature with Music: Pachelbel in the Garden
2003 – Exploring Nature with Music: Canada: From Sunrise to Sunset
2003 – Music for Your Health: Natural Stress Relief II
2003 – Gentle World: Celtic Reverie
2003 – Gentle World: Native Spirit
2003 – Gentle World: Tibetan Wonder
2003 – Frog Song (Nature Sound Recordings by Dan Gibson)
2003 – Listen to the Mockingbird (Nature Sound Recordings by Dan Gibson)
2003 – Mellow: Relaxation for a New Generation
2004 – Tranquil Cove
2004 – Gentle World: Andean Dreams
2004 – Thunderstorm: A Surround Sound Experience
2004 – What A Wonderful World (Sentimental Clarinet Quartet with Natural Sounds)
2004 – Asian Spa
2004 – European Spa
2004 – Polynesian Spa
2004 – Bliss: A Natural Chillout Experience
2004 – Forest Cello
2004 – Piano Classics
2004 – Homeward Bound
2005 – Oceansurf: A Surround Sound Experience
2005 – Brazilian Breeze
2005 – Celtic Serenity
2005 – Moonlight Sonata
2005 – Natural Grooves
2005 – Rocky Mountain Retreat
2005 – Songbirds at Sunset
2005 – Desert Spa
2005 – Luna Y Mar: Latin Love Songs for Guitar
2005 – Yoga at Dawn: Music for Wellness
2005 – T’ai Chi: Music for Wellness
2006 – Gentle World: Santorini Splendor
2006 – Call of the Loon: A Surround Sound Experience
2006 – Beyond the Sea (Sentimental Clarinet Quartet with Nature Sounds)
2006 – Sleep Deeply: Scientifically Designed
2006 – Songs for Sunset
2006 – Calm the Mind
2006 – Dock of the Bay
2006 – Dolphin Dreams
2006 – Central Park: A Peaceful Oasis in the City
2006 – Nurture the Soul
2006 – Relax the Body
2006 – Zen Relaxation
2007 – Gentle World: African Glory
2007 – Gentle World: Heavenly Hawaii
2007 – Songbirds: A Surround Sound Experience
2007 – Rejuvenate Naturally: Scientifically Designed
2007 – Relax Peacefully: Scientifically Designed
2007 – California Dreaming
2007 – Caribbean Spa
2007 – Evening by the Lake
2007 – Flute Dreams
2007 – Home: Peaceful Bluegrass
2007 – Illumination: Peaceful Gregorian Chants
2007 – Mystic Sky: Relaxing Native Flutes
2008 – H2O: A Solitudes Ambient Experience
2008 – Peace in the Valley (Instrumental Hymns with Nature Sounds)
2008 – America's Great National Parks
2008 – Blue Sky Classics
2008 – Cabana
2008 – Precious Earth
2008 – Seaside: Solo Piano
2008 – Tahiti: Voices of Paradise
2008 – India: Inner Peace Through Music and Nature Sounds
2008 – Costa Rica: An Eco Journey from Rainforest to Coral Reef
2009 – Ocean Odyssey
2009 – Relax Naturally: Scientifically Designed
2009 – O2: A Solitudes Ambient Experience
2009 – Mediterranean Spa
2009 – Island Spa
2009 – Breathing for Relaxation
2009 – Feng Shui: Living in Natural Harmony
2009 – Rejuvenating Rain: A Solo Piano Portrait
2009 – Dreaming by the Stream
2009 – Sentimental Moods
2009 – Mysterious Places
2009 – Natural Wonders of the World
2009 – Desert Spirit
2009 – Celtic Seashore
2010 – Shimmer: A Solitudes Ambient Experience
2010 – All Things Bright and Beautiful (Instrumental Hymns with Nature Sounds)
2010 – Sleeping Under the Stars
2010 – Canada: Naturally Beautiful
2010 – Gentle Harp
2010 – Moose Country
2010 – Native Harmony
2010 – Canoe Country
2010 – Wildflowers
2011 – Aria: A Gently Operatic Solitudes Experience
2011 – Serengeti: A Natural Symphony
2011 – Bali: An Exotic Escape
2011 – Southwest Spa
2012 – Classical Spa: Music for Relaxation
2012 – Songbird Suite
2012 – Ocean Spa: Relaxing World Flutes
2012 – Tranquility Bay
2012 – Sunshine on My Shoulders
2012 – Amalfi: A Peaceful Natural Escape
2012 – Zen Harmony: Music for Relaxation
2012 – Woodland Rain: Gentle Nature Sounds
2016 – A Mid-Summer's Evening
2016 – Evening by the Lake
2016 – Lost in a Daydream
2016 – Moonlight Shadows
2016 – Morning by the Sea
2016 – Morning in Cape Cod

Compilations
1984 - Sampler Album
1993 - Exploring Nature with Music: Favorite Selections
1995 - Exploring Nature with Music: Loon Echo Lake
1996 - Exploring Nature with Music: Favorite Selections II
1998 - Exploring Nature with Music: Christmas Wish
1998 - Natural Beauty: Pachelbel - Beethoven - Mozart
1998 - Sampler CD Vol. 2
1999 - Fields of Summer
2001 - The Best of Solitudes: 20th Anniversary Collection
2004 - Nature's Many Moods: Soothing Soundscapes
2006 - Solitudes 25: Silver Anniversary Collection
2008 - Guitarscapes (The Best of Solitudes)
2008 - Pianoscapes (The Best of Solitudes)
2008 - Gentle World
2008 - Spa
2008 - Relaxation
2008 - Inspiration
2008 - Classical
2009 - Native Spirit: A Relaxing Flute Collection
2009 - Exotic Escapes: The Peaceful South Pacific
2010 - Exploring Nature with Music: Loon Echo Lake
2010 - Majestic Alaska
2012 - Journey to Loon Lake: A Nature Sound Experience
2012 - Seascapes: A Relaxing Nature Sound Experience
2012 - Dream Waters: Soothing Ocean Surf and Gentle Rainstorms for Relaxation

Notes

Compilation albums by Canadian artists
Compilation album series